Gathynia ferrugata is a moth of the family Uraniidae first described by Francis Walker in 1866. It is found in Sri Lanka.

References

Moths of Asia
Moths described in 1866
Uraniidae